Perchloromethyl mercaptan is the organosulfur compound with the formula CCl3SCl.  It is mainly used as an intermediate for the synthesis of dyes and fungicides (captan, folpet).  It is a colorless oil, although commercial samples are yellowish. It is insoluble in water but soluble in organic solvents.  It has a foul, unbearable, acrid odor.  Perchloromethyl mercaptan is the original name. The systematic name is trichloromethanesulfenyl chloride, because the compound is a sulfenyl chloride, not a mercaptan.

History
It was used as a chemical warfare agent by the French in the 1915 battle of Champagne. Shortly thereafter, wartime use was abandoned due to the clear warning properties, the decomposition in the presence of iron and steel, and the easy removal of the vapor by charcoal.

Preparation
The method to prepare perchloromethyl mercaptan was first described by Rathke in 1873 and is still used. Carbon disulfide is chlorinated using an iodine catalyst. The following equations operate most efficiently at temperatures below about 30 °C

CS2 + 3 Cl2 → CCl3SCl + SCl2

2 CS2 + 5 Cl2 → 2 CCl3SCl + S2Cl2

At higher temperatures, the chlorination gives carbon tetrachloride and additional sulfur chlorides. The formation of byproducts can be suppressed by performing the reaction in the presence of diketones. Another byproduct is thiophosgene. The more volatile byproducts such as carbon tetrachloride and sulfur dichloride can be removed by distillation. The separation of perchloromethyl mercaptan from S2Cl2 by distillation is challenging since their boiling points are very close. Another byproduct that forms is hexachloroethane. Innovations in the basic Rathke method have been reported.

Reactivity
The compound slowly hydrolyzes:

CSCl4 + 2 H2O → CO2 + 4 HCl +  S8

The compound is corrosive to most metals. It reacts with iron, evolving carbon tetrachloride.  Perchloromethyl mercaptan is oxidized by nitric acid to trichloromethanesulfonyl chloride (Cl3CSO2Cl), a white solid.

Toxicity

When it is heated or in a fire, it will emit toxic and corrosive gases. It is also very toxic by inhalation or skin absorption.

At least two mechanisms could account for the toxicity of perchloromethyl mercaptan, as hypothesized by Althoff (1973). The first mechanism is a reaction between perchloromethyl mercaptan and biological functional groups such as hydroxyl, sulfhydryl, amino and carboxyl groups. This results in an inactivation of key enzymes.  A second general pathway reaction is the hydrolysis to give hydrochloric acid.

References

External links
CDC - NIOSH Pocket Guide to Chemical Hazards

Organosulfur compounds
Trichloromethyl compounds
Pulmonary agents
Foul-smelling chemicals